Three Visions is a 1935 suite in three parts for solo piano, and later, the second part, Summerland, for chamber orchestra, by American composer William Grant Still. According to Judith Anne Still, the composer's daughter, "The three segments of the suite, Dark Horsemen, Summerland, and Radiant Pinnacle, tell the story of the human soul after death: the body expires, and the soul goes on to an apocalyptic judgment. If it is seen that the past life has been a good one, the soul may enter “heaven,” or “Summerland”. After a period of time, the soul may reincarnate to learn additional earthly lessons on the human plane. Some souls reincarnate many times in a constant circular progress toward Godly perfection." Three Visions was composed by Still for his wife, Verna Arvey, who first played the composition in Los Angeles in 1936. The suite is about eleven minutes long.

Overview
A description of Three Visions is presented as follows:

Parts
Three Visions is in three parts as follows:
Still created a version of Summerland for violin and orchestra.

See also
 List of jazz-influenced classical compositions

References

Further reading

External links
 
 

Compositions by William Grant Still
1935 compositions